SKSS may refer to the following:

  SKSS, a Christian School
 South Kamloops Secondary School